Frédéric Descrozaille (born 16 April 1967) is a French politician of La République En Marche! (LREM) who has been serving as a member of the French National Assembly since 18 June 2017, representing the department of Val-de-Marne.

Political career 
In parliament, Descrozaille has been serving on the Committee on Economic Affairs. From 2017 to 2019, he was also a member of the Committee on Foreign Affairs (2017–2019). Since 2021, he has been the parliament’s rapporteur on climate risks for agriculture.

See also
 2017 French legislative election

References

1967 births
Living people
Deputies of the 15th National Assembly of the French Fifth Republic
La République En Marche! politicians
People from Neuilly-sur-Seine
Politicians from Île-de-France
Lycée Louis-le-Grand alumni
Sciences Po alumni
Deputies of the 16th National Assembly of the French Fifth Republic